Garbce  is a village in the administrative district of Gmina Żmigród, in Trzebnica County, Lower Silesian Voivodeship, in south-western Poland.

References

Garbce